San Andres, officially the Municipality of San Andres,  is a 4th class municipality in the province of Quezon, Philippines. According to the 2020 census, it has a population of 37,454 people.

History
President Carlos P. Garcia issued Executive Order (EO) No. 353 on August 20, 1959, wherein six barrios of San Narciso were organized into the municipal district of San Andres. His successor, Diosdado Macapagal, issued EO No. 357 on October 5, 1965, declaring and considering the said political unit a municipality "beginning July 1, 1963".

Geography 
Administratively, the town of San Andres is subdivided into seven barangays. Poblacion forms the center, whereas the other six are in the outlying areas which are several kilometres away from the center of the municipality. The municipality also includes the island barangay of Alibijaban in the Ragay Gulf.

Barangays
San Andres is politically subdivided into seven barangays.

 Alibihaban
 Camflora
 Mangero
 Pansoy
 Tala
 Talisay
 Poblacion

Climate

Demographics

Economy

References

External links

San Andres Profile at PhilAtlas.com
[ Philippine Standard Geographic Code]
Philippine Census Information
Local Governance Performance Management System

Municipalities of Quezon
Establishments by Philippine executive order